Chervone-Pustohorod was an air base in Ukraine located 22 km northeast of Hlukhiv. It was built as a forward operating base for wartime use.

It is named after a town of Esman that in 1957–2016 was known as Chervone.

References
RussianAirFields.com

Soviet Air Force bases
Ukrainian airbases